Gastón Duprat (born December 8, 1969 ) and Mariano Cohn (born December 1, 1975) are TV and film directors and producers from Argentina. They began their career in TV in 1999, when they created and produced Televisión Abierta, an innovative and interactive TV show where the viewers created the content by requesting a cameraman to visit them to record a short clip (less than a minute). They both won the Konex Award Merit Diploma in 2002.

Early steps 
Gastón and Mariano met during a regional experimental video festival in Buenos Aires back in 1993, where Gastón was a member of the jury and Mariano was in competition with his video Un día más en la tierra. They began exchanging ideas after the event and started to work on new projects. They have been creative and business partners since then. 
In the fields of experimental film and video they have created more than twenty works that have been seen in movie theaters, art-house venues and museums around the world.  Some of the better known titles are: Cámara de sombra (1990), Circuito (1993), Venimos llenos de Tierra (1996), Hectárea (1998), Soy Francisco López (2000), 20/12 (2001) and Hágalo usted mismo (2002)

Television 
In TV, they designed conceptual and innovative formats like Televisión Abierta (1999), Cupido (2000), Cuentos de terror (2001), Navegando con Fede (2002), and El Amante TV (2007), among others. They designed, founded and directed the cultural TV channel Ciudad Abierta (2003) for the City of Buenos Aires, where they developed new concepts for mass communication.

Film 
In the area of the feature films they started directing Enciclopedia (1998) and Yo Presidente (2006); a feature documentary film coproduced with journalist Luis Majul and Patagonik (Disney Films) that obtained the First Prize in the International Festival of Independent Cinema from Mexico and the Best Prize for Documentary Film at the Malaga Film Festival.

Two years later they directed El artista (2008) aka The Artist, an art-house film composed entirely by long tracking shots that questions where the limits are established between an artist and his work in the ambiguous world of contemporary art. coproduced between Aleph Media (Argentina), Cinecittá and Istituto Luce (Italy), and received the Ibermedia (Spain) grant for film production.

El hombre de al lado (2009) aka The Man Next Door, a story that exposes a clash between neighbors, and how these neighbors deal with their differences. The film was entirely shot at the Casa Curutchet (Curutchet House), the only residential house designed and built by the famous Swiss-French architect Le Corbusier in the Americas. The movie won the Best Argentine Feature Film prize at the 24º Mar del Plata Film Festival in Argentina, the Best Cinematography Award in the World Dramatic Competition at Sundance 2010, and it was selected to participate at The Lincoln Center Film Society’s and MoMA’s 2010 New Directors/New Films Festival in New York, USA.

Living stars (2014) is a documentary presenting, through long static tripos shots, people dancing in their homes and offices.

In The Distinguished Citizen (Spanish: El ciudadano ilustre, 2016), a Nobel Prize winning author living in Barcelona is invited back to his Argentine hometown to accept honors, jury an art show, and deliver lectures, while facing both the reverence and contempt of the townspeople he used as the basis for his novels.

Official Competition (Competencia oficial) was released in 2021.

Filmography

Feature film

Documentary

Awards by film

References

External links 
 Gastón Duprat & Mariano Cohn at the Internet Movie Database
 Gastón Duprat & Mariano Cohn at Cinenacional.com

Duprat